Ki Daophet Nouhouang (1 July 1972 – 24 April 2020) was a Laotian Luk thung singer.

Early life and start on stage
He was born on 1 July 1972 in Na Wang Village, Nong Bok District, Khammouane Province. He has three siblings. He started performing in 1994 when his siblings founded Luk thung band Num Kosin and became popular in Laos. In 1997, he started as a solo singer.

Popularity and Jee Hoy (Original name Hoy Jee Kheam Lao
He became known in 2001 through his studio album Nam Ta Kway, that includes a number of popular songs, such as Nam Ta Kway, Muei Tha and Jee Hoy, which was covered by Pee Saderd, Thai Mor lam, Rock singer, and was very popular.

Death
Ki Daophet Nouhouang died on 24 April 2020 due to kidney failure, at age 47.

Discography

Studio Album
 1997 - Sao Xe Bangfai
 2001 - Namta Kawy
 2002 - Sor See
 2008 - Mor lam 2008 (with Bounkerd Nouhuang)
 2014 - Sao Mak Nao Bao Na Wang (with Pink Rassamee)
 2018 - Loek Ya La Faen

Single
 2008 - Miea Mak Phay
 2014 - Kee Mo (with Pink Rassamee)
 2018 
 Loek Ya La Faen
 Fah Oum Fon Kue Khon Oum Nong
 Koy Nonh Kuen Udomxai
 Mae Hamg Look Sam

References

1971 births
2020 deaths
Laotian male singers
Mor lam musicians
Deaths from kidney failure
Lao-language singers